Henry Harrison Russell (November 27, 1881 – 1968) was an American football, basketball and baseball coach. He was the eighth head football coach at Illinois State University in Normal, Illinois, serving from 1912 to 1922 and compiling a record of 15–43–10.

Russell later taught geography at Clark University and Bloomsburg State Teacher's College.

References

External links
 

1881 births
1968 deaths
American men's basketball coaches
Basketball coaches from Illinois
College men's basketball head coaches in the United States
Illinois State Redbirds baseball coaches
Illinois State Redbirds football coaches
Illinois State Redbirds men's basketball coaches
Harvard University alumni
People from Will County, Illinois
Sportspeople from the Chicago metropolitan area